The United States Department of the Army offers a variety of awards, decorations and incentive programs to honor and recognize the contribution and efforts of its civilian workforce.  Department of the Army civilian awards are governed by Army Regulation 672–20 Decorations, Awards, and Honors Incentive Awards.

There are three categories of recognition: monetary, honorary, and time-off.

Superior accomplishment awards 
 Special Act or Service Award – A SASA is a cash award given to recognize a meritorious personal effort, act, service, scientific or other achievement accomplished within or outside assigned job responsibilities. All appropriated fund employees are eligible for this award. Cash awards range from $25 to $25,000, depending on the achievement being recognized. (An additional award exceeding $25,000 may be approved at the direction of the President.)
 On-the-Spot Cash Award – The OTS cash award is a small SASA ($25 to $250) which may be given by a supervisor for day to day accomplishments of subordinate employees.
 Time Off Award – Employees may be granted up to 80 hours of time off during a leave year without charge to leave or loss of pay as an award for achievements or performance contributing to the Army mission.
 Performance Award – A performance award is a monetary award given in recognition of high-level performance for a specific period. This award is used to recognize all appropriated fund employees, except Senior Executive Service (SES) employees. Performance awards will be computed as a percentage of pay with a maximum award of 10 percent of the employee’s base pay.

Valorous awards
The Secretary of the Army Award for Valor is awarded for acts of heroism or bravery connected with an Army employee or Army activity, or that in some way benefits the Army. Recipients will have distinguished themselves by exhibiting great courage or sacrifice involving heroism or bravery. The performance of the act must be a voluntary action above and beyond the call of duty. The act may be recognized if it is connected with an Army employee or Army activity, or if the Army in some way benefits from the act. Awards will be made only to recognize single acts of heroism or bravery. This award is not presented in recognition of activities or conflict with an armed enemy. The situation must have involved personal hazard or danger and the voluntary risk of life. Awards are not made solely for saving a life.

Honorary awards 
Honorary awards are intended to be presented to Department of the Army civilian employees in recognition of noteworthy accomplishments. Honorary awards may be given to civilian employees at any time in their careers, including occasions such as retirement, reassignment, transfer, or separation, provided the individual’s accomplishments fully meet the criteria for the particular award.

Medals (in order of precedence)
Distinguished Civilian Service Medal
Superior Civilian Service Medal
Meritorious Civilian Service Medal
Civilian Service Commendation Medal (formerly known as the Commander's Award for Civilian Service)
Civilian Service Achievement Medal
Civilian Award for Humanitarian Service
Armed Forces Civilian Service Medal

Other Department of the Army honorary awards for civilian federal employees
 Patriotic Public Service Lapel Pin
 Certificate of Achievement
 Commendation Certificate
 Certificate of Appreciation
 Secretary of the Army Award for Outstanding Achievement in Materiel Acquisition
 Department of the Army Certificate of Promotion
 Award for Outstanding Service in the Army Senior Executive Service
 Awards for Outstanding Service in a Senior Level or Senior Scientific and Professional Position

Public service awards 
Awards for public service may be awarded to persons or groups who are not employed by the Army. Presidential appointees and non-career senior Army officials are eligible for these awards. Army civilian employees who are eligible for Army honorary awards, military personnel, and Army contractors are ineligible. These awards are in hierarchical order from the highest to the lowest.

 Distinguished Public Service Medal
 Superior Public Service Medal
 Meritorious Public Service Medal
 Public Service Commendation Medal
 Patriotic Public Service Lapel Pin
 Civilian Award for Humanitarian Service
 Certificate of Appreciation

See also 
 Awards and decorations of the United States government

References 

Civil awards and decorations of the United States